Major League Baseball games not broadcast exclusively by its media partners are televised by regional sports networks, which present sports programming of interest to their respective region. Most MLB broadcasters are members of chains such as NBC Sports Regional Networks, Bally Sports, and AT&T SportsNet, although several teams are broadcast by regional networks that are independent of these chains. Some teams own partial or majority stakes in their regional broadcaster.

Regionally broadcast MLB games are subject to blackouts; games from outside of a viewer's designated market are blacked out to protect the local team. In addition, certain national regular season telecasts on ESPN, FS1, and TBS are non-exclusive, and may also air in tandem with telecasts of the game by local broadcasters. However, national telecasts of these games may be blacked out in the participating teams' markets to protect the local broadcaster.

American League

Baltimore Orioles

When the Montreal Expos were relocated to Washington, D.C. in 2004, the issue arose regarding television rights for the new franchise. Since at least 1981, Major League Baseball had designated the Baltimore Orioles television territory to extend from Harrisburg, Pennsylvania to Charlotte, North Carolina.

The Orioles agreed to share its territory with the Nationals in return for the ability to present the Nationals games on the Orioles television network, the Mid-Atlantic Sports Network. The Orioles have a 90 percent stake in MASN and MLB paid the Orioles $75 million for 10 percent of the regional sports network. When the Lerner family bought the Nationals in July 2006 they became part owners in MASN. Over the next 23 years, the Washington Nationals’ stake in the network will increase to 33 percent. Under the current arrangement, MASN paid the Nationals $20 million to broadcast their games in 2005.

Boston Red Sox

Boston Red Sox baseball coverage began in 1984 on the New England Sports Network, airing mostly road games on the newly formed pay cable channel. Former Sox second baseman Kent Derdivanis served as the play-by-play announcer and Mike Andrews provided color commentary. NESN periodically sent guest color commentators to the booth, with the likes of Rico Petrocelli, Bill Monbouquette, and Dick Radatz. The in-studio host was a young man just out of Syracuse University named Sean McDonough.

Fast-forwarding 24 years later, NESN now carries full coverage (minus some nationally broadcast games on FOX and ESPN) of Red Sox games as well as in-depth pre- and post-game shows. Unlike previous seasons where it split coverage with over-the-air stations, it now broadcasts all games not on national television, using the slogan "One Nation, One Network". In 2006, it became the first network to broadcast all its Major League Baseball team's games in high definition, available to cable providers throughout New England, DirecTV, AT&T U-Verse (in CT) and Verizon FIOS (in MA). Dish Network only provides NESN in HD during live Red Sox, Boston Bruins, Hartford Colonials (UFL), as of 2010, and College Hockey games, most notably The Beanpot (Ice Hockey) Tournament.

Chicago White Sox

In October 2004, FSN Chicago lost broadcast rights to all of the professional sports teams in the Chicago area when the owners of the Bulls, White Sox, Blackhawks, and Cubs decided to end their agreement with the network and partnered with Comcast to form Comcast SportsNet Chicago. This led to a number of cable/satellite providers dropping the network. With the end of local pro sports coverage, FSN Chicago became mostly a feeder channel of the national network's entire schedule, some minor local and semi-pro teams, Midwestern outdoors programs, and sports rights and games from other college conferences of little interest to Chicago area viewers. In 2005, Cablevision bought all of FSN Chicago when NewsCorp swapped assets with the cable company.

The White Sox also shared broadcast television rights with the Cubs on WGN-TV since 1948. Starting with the 2020 season, NBC Sports Chicago (originally CSN Chicago) will have exclusive rights to regionally-aired White Sox games.

Cleveland Guardians

Cleveland Guardians regional games are currently held by Bally Sports Great Lakes. The network was originally founded in 2006 by the Dolan family as Sportstime Ohio, which was later purchased by Fox Sports Networks in 2012 before Diamond Sports Group took over ownership in 2020. It operated as a separate business venture, it can be compared to the New York Yankees' YES Network, as both were started primarily to broadcast each team's games.  However they differ in that YES is owned by a holding company that also owns the Yankees, whereas STO was a venture separate from the Guardians that is directly owned by Larry Dolan, Cleveland Guardians owner.

Thirty minutes before each Guardians game, Bally Sports Great Lakes airs "Guardians Live," a pre-game show hosted by Al Pawlowski. It features highlights from the previous game, a preview of the upcoming game, and news from around baseball.

Detroit Tigers

PASS Sports was started by Tom Monaghan in 1984, who at the time also owned the Detroit Tigers. In 1992, Monaghan sold the Tigers to Mike Ilitch and PASS was sold to Post-Newsweek Stations and merged with the Post's Detroit television station WDIV (Detroit's NBC affiliate).

Following the purchase, PASS moved its studios and offices from Ann Arbor, MI to WDIV's in Detroit. PASS became available on basic cable, (under Monaghan it was a premium cable network). Post-Newsweek made the station 24-hours, (under Monaghan it only airing in the evening and on weekends).

Fox Sports Detroit was launched as a competitor to PASS in 1996. After a surprise bid in 1996 to pick up the rights to the Detroit Pistons, Fox Sports Detroit began planning to launch their network two years later.

When Detroit Red Wings and Detroit Tigers rights were up for bid, Fox Sports Detroit decided to accelerate their launch date by bidding and winning the rights to the Red Wings beginning with the 1997–98 season and the Tigers beginning in 1998. The Washington Post Company, the parent company of Post-Newsweek Stations sold the remaining year (1998) of the Tigers, Pistons contracts and the contract of broadcaster John Keating to Fox Sports Detroit. In 2021, the network was rebranded to Bally Sports Detroit and is currently the exclusive local home of the Detroit Tigers.

Houston Astros

Home Sports Entertainment was home of the Houston Astros from its inception in 1983 until the mid-1990s, when the network became part of the Prime Sports Networks. Prime Sports Southwest lasted only two years before its parent company was purchased by News Corporation and renamed Fox Sports Southwest. In 2005, a sub-feed of Fox Sports Southwest was formed, called Fox Sports Houston, which focused on Houston-based teams including the Astros. In January 2009, Fox Sports Houston broke away from its parent network and became a stand-alone network, however that network became defunct when the Astros and Rockets teams purchased a majority ownership in the new regional sports network Comcast SportsNet Houston, and moved their programming there. In 2014, DirecTV and AT&T acquired Comcast SportsNet Houston out of bankruptcy and was eventually rebranded as AT&T SportsNet Southwest (formerly Root Sports Southwest).

Kansas City Royals

Sports Time was a regional sports network in the United States. It was owned by Anheuser-Busch and was launched on April 2, 1984.

The new network was a way for Anheuser-Busch to show additional games of the St. Louis Cardinals, the Major League Baseball team it owned at the time. Games of the Cincinnati Reds and Kansas City Royals baseball teams, the St. Louis Blues of the National Hockey League, and various college sports teams also aired on the network.

Sports Time showed Reggie Jackson's 500th career home run on September 17, 1984. The Royals were playing the California Angels in Anaheim, California that night.

After a season of obvious frustration, Anheuser-Busch pulled the plug on Sports Time at the end of March 1985. Today, the Cardinals and Reds are shown on Fox Sports Net in their respective regions, Midwest and Ohio. Beginning with the 2008 season, Fox Sports Kansas City will show most Royals games. For the first season, 140 games are scheduled to be aired. In 2021, Fox Sports Kansas City rebranded itself as Bally Sports Kansas City. The Blues are also shown on FSN Midwest.

Los Angeles Angels

In 1990, Prime Ticket became the cable television home of the California Angels, as well as serving as the cable home of the Clippers for one season (1990–91), before they moved to the now-defunct SportsChannel Los Angeles (originally Z Channel) the following season. Angels games are currently shown on Bally Sports West. One other local network showing the Angels games is the over-the-air MY 13 Los Angeles network, or KCOP-TV Los Angeles.

Minnesota Twins

The Minnesota Twins baseball team launched Victory Sports One as a cable and satellite television regional sports network in October 2003. Victory Sports, of course, became the exclusive TV home of Twins games; in addition, it planned coverage of various Minnesota college and high school games. The channel also simulcast ESPNEWS.

The Twins opted to retain the local broadcast rights for game broadcasts after the 2003 season, in order to carry the games on their own network, after carriage for many years on Midwest Sports Channel (currently Bally Sports North). The model for the plan was the success of the New York Yankees' YES Network.

However Victory Sports was unable to obtain carriage from the primary cable television providers in the Twin Cities, the rest of the state of Minnesota, and the Dakotas, or from DirecTV or Dish Network. During the 2004 season, the Twins quickly re-signed with FSN North to placate viewers inconvenienced by the change.

New York Yankees

Between 1989 and 2001, the MSG Network was the cable home of the New York Yankees. MSG paid an average of $55 million a year for those rights, and the deal is widely credited as having started a national trend towards greater team coverage on regional sports networks, with more games being broadcast than over-the-air stations' regular programming schedules could usually permit. MSG also produced the Yankees radio broadcasts from 1994 to 2001, which aired on WABC. MSG also owned the over the air broadcast rights to Yankee games, which they sold to long-time broadcaster WPIX from 1989 to 1998 and WNYW from 1999 to 2001 (at the time, News Corporation owned part of MSG). In 2002, the Yankees left MSG to form the YES Network. From 2002 to 2005, MSG aired games from Major League Baseball's New York Mets on Tuesday and Wednesday nights, games which previously aired on FSNY (MSG, FSNY, and WPIX each carried about 50 games a season on consistent days of the week). Like the Yankee deals, Cablevision also owned the broadcast TV rights, placing games on WWOR-TV before moving to WPIX in 1999. After the 2005 baseball season, Mets games moved to SportsNet New York, a cable network partially owned by the Mets, although WPIX retained a reduced slate of games. Comcast and Time Warner, which generally control whatever NYC-area cable systems Cablevision doesn't (Time Warner controls most of Upstate New York as well), are the other partners. From 2002 onward, games started airing on the newer YES Network.

Seattle Mariners

Root Sports Northwest is the regional carrier of the Seattle Mariners, televising their games in Washington, Oregon, Alaska and parts of Idaho and Montana.

Toronto Blue Jays

As the Blue Jays are the only MLB team in Canada, the entire country is considered the regional territory of the Toronto Blue Jays. Blue Jays games are broadcast by Sportsnet, owned by team owner Rogers Communications. Although the main Sportsnet service is operated as a set of regional sports networks, all games are broadcast nationally, and the regionalized feeds are primarily used for NHL regional blackouts only. Under Labatt ownership, the team was broadcast by TSN, which was previously co-owned with the team. The network continued to sub-license a package of Blue Jays games from Rogers until the 2010 season, when Sportsnet became the exclusive broadcaster of all Blue Jays games. Both Sportsnet and TSN air packages of U.S. games, coming from other regional sports networks and ESPN respectively. TVA Sports provides French-language coverage of selected games.

In addition, in the past some Blue Jays games were televised nationally on Canadian over-the-air networks, namely CBC and CTV. During their existence, Blue Jays games were sometimes blacked out in Quebec to protect the Montreal Expos. Some over-the-air games were blacked out in Windsor to protect the Detroit Tigers.

National League

Chicago Cubs

Chicago Cubs games are split between three broadcasters; Comcast SportsNet Chicago (owned by a consortium of NBCUniversal, and the Bulls, White Sox, Blackhawks, and Cubs—and displacing FSN Chicago in 2004), WGN Sports (whose games are split between WGN-TV and WPWR-TV), and WLS-TV. Some Cubs games on WGN were seen nationally via sister network WGN America (formerly Superstation WGN), although this was discontinued as part of its transition to a general entertainment cable network.  Due to licensing by the CRTC, the WGN feed that is seen in Chicago is also available in Canada on some Digital Cable/Satellite providers, meaning some Cubs games can be seen despite Canada being considered the home territory of the Toronto Blue Jays.  Games televised by WGN Sports or WLS-TV are syndicated by a network of affiliated stations within the team's territory.

Beginning with the 2020 season, Cubs games will air on the new Marquee Sports Network, a regional sports network founded and operated by the Cubs and Sinclair Broadcast Group.

Colorado Rockies

From 1993 to 1996, the Rockies were without a cable television affiliate.  That changed, when FSN Rocky Mountain acquired the regional cable rights in 1997, and the team has aired most of its games on that network since then, sharing some of its games with KWGN (1997–2002) and KTVD-My 20 (2003–2008).  Starting in 2009, FSN Rocky Mountain (later Root Sports and currently AT&T SportsNet Rocky Mountain) became the exclusive TV outlet for the Rockies.

Los Angeles Dodgers

Games are presented on Spectrum SportsNet LA and have been since 2014.  The Dodgers own 50% of the channel in association with Charter Communications. Prior to September 2016, the channel was known as Time Warner Cable Sportsnet LA before the acquisition of Time Warner Cable by Charter Communications.

This arrangement has not been without controversy due to carriage disputes with other major cable providers leaving many unable to see the games in the Los Angeles area.

From January 1997 to September 2013, Fox Sports Net West 2 (later renamed Fox Sports Prime Ticket, now simply called Prime Ticket) was formed to serve as a cable home for the Clippers, Dodgers, Ducks, and all other events that FSN West didn't have room for. This is after the December 1993 shut-down of SportsChannel Los Angeles, which left their home teams with only over-the-air and part-time cable coverage locally.

Miami Marlins

From 1993 to 2005, the Marlins Television Network aired games to homes not only in South Florida but to other parts of Florida. The network was produced by the same crew that telecast Marlins games on cable television. When FSN Florida signed an exclusive long-term deal for Marlins baseball starting in the 2006 season, that signaled the end of the Marlins Television Network as a majority of those telecasts would air on Sun Sports.

New York Mets

SportsNet New York (SNY) is a New York City-based sports cable network which airs in the New York metro area and all of New York state, and nationwide via satellite. It is owned jointly by the New York Mets, Time Warner, and Comcast.

SNY will carry 120 Mets games during 2007 season (with the remainder airing on WPIX, Fox, and ESPN). Bill Webb, who directs the World Series and the All-Star Game for Fox, is the director for Mets broadcasts on both SNY and WPIX.

Philadelphia Phillies

CSN Philadelphia was the very first Comcast Sportsnet and broadcasts the Comcast-owned Philadelphia 76ers and Philadelphia Flyers, along with the Philadelphia Phillies.

CSN Philadelphia debuted on October 1, 1997, replacing the old PRISM Network in the Philadelphia area. The Phillies own a minority share of the channel.

CSN Philadelphia's studios and offices are located inside the Wells Fargo Center in Philadelphia. CSN Philadelphia also has a small studio inside Citizens Bank Park, which is used sporadically during the baseball season.

In addition, Comcast owns The Comcast Network, which on occasion will air Phillies games in the Philadelphia metro area when a Flyers or 76ers game airs on CSN Philadelphia. WPHL-TV also carries a slate of games from each team. WPSG formerly carried Phillies games, but WPHL-TV took broadcasting rights in 2009.

In 2017, Comcast SportsNet was rebranded under the NBC Sports name (this in conjunction to Comcast's 2011 acquisition and integration of NBCUniversal) and CSN Philadelphia was renamed NBC Sports Philadelphia. TCN subsequently became NBC Sports Philadelphia Plus.

San Diego Padres

Bally Sports San Diego is the regional broadcaster of the Padres, having displacing previous rights holder 4SD, a local cable channel owned by Cox Communications, in 2012.

St. Louis Cardinals

Between 1984 and 1989, the Cardinals aired 50 games a season, first on Sports Time (1984), then on pay-per-view on Cencom.  After being off cable television for four seasons (1990–93), the Cardinals returned to the cable airwaves in 1994 through Prime Sports Midwest, which became FSN Midwest in November 1996.  The Cardinals have been on FSN Midwest since then.  The Cardinals will again air 130 regular-season games on FSN Midwest in 2010, with the other 32 on either ESPN, Fox or NBC affiliate KSDK-TV 5.  For many seasons, Joe Buck and Al Hrabosky were the commentators, but Dan McLaughlin has since replaced Buck, who now does MLB and NFL games for Fox-TV.

Washington Nationals

When the Montreal Expos were relocated to Washington, D.C. in 2004, the issue arose regarding television rights for the new franchise. Since at least 1981, Major League Baseball had designated the Baltimore Orioles television territory to extend from Harrisburg, Pennsylvania to Charlotte, North Carolina.

The Orioles agreed to share its territory with the Nationals in return for the ability to present the Nationals games on the Orioles television network, the Mid-Atlantic Sports Network. The Orioles have a 90 percent stake in MASN and MLB paid the Orioles $75 million for 10 percent of the regional sports network. When the Lerner family bought the Nationals in July 2006 they became part owners in MASN. Over the next 23 years, the Washington Nationals’ stake in the network will increase to 33 percent. Under the current arrangement, MASN paid the Nationals $20 million to broadcast their games in 2005.

Online streaming of local games 
Until 2020, all in-market streaming rights for each team were controlled by Major League Baseball.

For a period, the Yankees and Padres streamed their regional games online through subscription services, but as of the 2015 season, only the Toronto Blue Jays offered in-market streaming of their games to authenticated subscribers of the team's broadcaster within its designated market (Sportsnet also sells access to its networks, and these games, as an over-the-top subscription service). Regional games were not available on TV Everywhere services such as Fox Sports Go or the NBC Sports app, and in-market streaming is not available via MLB.tv because games are always blacked out for in-market teams.

Current commissioner Rob Manfred stated in an April 2015 interview with the Wall Street Journal that MLB planned to finalize a plan to allow in-market streaming of regional games "some time this year". Major League Baseball and representatives of its regional broadcasters have attempted to negotiate how in-market streaming for U.S. teams would operate, including whether digital rights to regional games would be centralized and held by an exclusive partner, and whether local rightsholders would be able to distribute the telecasts through their own services and apps, or whether all in-market games would have to be offered through existing MLB apps. Providers objected to having in-market streaming be MLB-controlled, as they would gain access to users' credentials.

As of the 2016 Major League Baseball season, Fox reached a three-year deal to offer in-market streaming of its 15 teams to authenticated subscribers of the corresponding Fox Sports Networks. Fox pays a digital rights fee for each team, and the streams are managed by MLB Advanced Media but delivered through the existing Fox Sports Go applications. Wider adoption began to spread in the 2017 season, with NBC Sports Regional Networks and SportsNet New York (via the NBC Sports app), Root Sports (now AT&T SportsNet in most markets), and NESN launching in-market streaming of their local teams. Only three teams—the Baltimore Orioles and Washington Nationals (who share MASN as their rightsholder), and the Los Angeles Dodgers, do not offer in-market streaming.

As of the 2020 season, MLB's owners voted unanimously to revert ownership of "certain in-market digital rights" to the teams themselves. Commissioner Manfred stated that digital streaming had become "substitutional with broadcast rights", and that these changes would allow teams more flexibility in selling their digital rights in the future. However, such arrangements may still be subject to negotiations with existing regional rightsholders.

2023 developments

On February 15, 2023, Diamond Sports Group, which operates the Bally Sports networks and which holds the television rights to 14 of MLB's 30 clubs, did not pay a $140 million debt payment on time. Commissioner Manfred said at a press conference before the 2023 season that he hoped that MLB could make broadcasts available for all teams available via MLB.tv, without local blackouts, in the event that regional sports networks are unable to provide coverage. On March 14, Diamond Sports Group filed for Chapter 11 bankruptcy protection in an attempt to restructure its debt.

On February 24, Warner Bros. Discovery (WBD), which operates three AT&T SportsNet channels and has a minority stake in Root Sports Northwest, informed teams and leagues that it intends to exit the regional sports network business, focusing instead on its national broadcasts of the NBA on TNT and the NHL on TNT. AT&T SportsNet networks told the Rockies, Astros, and Pirates that they do not have the money to make scheduled rights fee payments, and gave each team until March 31 to negotiate deals to take their television rights back.  The president of AT&T SportsNet told The Seattle Times that Root Sports Northwest was unaffected by WBD's announcement, as the Mariners themselves have owned a majority stake in the channel since 2013.

In response to the potential loss of broadcasters for 17 of its teams, MLB created a new local media department and hired Doug Johnson as senior vice president and executive producer of local media, Greg Pennell as senior VP of local media, and Kendall Burgess as VP of local media technical operations. Johnson had worked for AT&T SportsNet Pittsburgh. Pennell and Burgess were previously employees of Bally Sports.

See also
List of current Major League Baseball announcers
Major League Baseball on cable television
Fox Sports Networks#Networks

References

External links
SBJ: Lack of races chases baseball TV ratings down

Regional sports networks
SportsChannel
Fox Sports original programming
Prime Sports
NBC Sports Regional Networks
YES Network
Sportsnet
Madison Square Garden Sports
SportsNet New York
Mid-Atlantic Sports Network
Time Warner Cable
Bally Sports
Regional sports networks
Local sports television programming in the United States